I'm Willing is the sixth album by Canadian music artist Marker Starling (Chris A. Cummings), released in 2016 in Europe and in 2017 in North America. It is a collection of cover versions.

Limiting himself to a much pared-down instrumentation in contrast to 2015's Rosy Maze, Cummings recorded the album in a very short time in Paris, which he feels helped the creative process retain a vibrancy necessary to the project. Having Lætitia Sadier of Stereolab contributing vocals also helped him achieve the ambiance he strove to create as the album has a recurring theme of love and affection. The cross-section of songs covered ranges from highly regarded classics to little known gems that Cummings discovered over the years as an ardent vinyl collector.

Track listing

Side 1
 Stormy (Dennis Yost, J.R. Cobb, Buddy Buie) (3:31)
 A Perfect Day (Bobby Cole) (3:36)
 I'm Willing (Tommy Keith, Arthur Cole) (3:44)
 For Real (Richard Elijah Flowers) (4:13)
  Amsterdam (John Cale) (2:52)

Side 2
 Lost in Paradise (Caetano Veloso) (3:13)
 Meaning Of Love (Steve Kuhn) (2:43)
  Would You Believe in Me (Jon Lucien) (2:39)
  Moves (Doug Hammond) (2:34)
  The Smiling Hour (Abre Alas) (Ivan Lins, Vítor Martins, Louis Oliveira) (3:40)

Personnel
Produced and mixed by Emma Mario
Recorded at Panorama Studio, Paris
Mastered by Harris Newman at Grey Market Mastering
Illustrations by Oliver Husain
Design by Jan Lankisch
Chris A. Cummings – vocals, Yamaha CP-80
Lætitia Sadier – vocals
Nina Savary – vocals
Julien Gasc – bass, backing vocals
Nina Savary, Olia Eichenbaum – backing vocals
Emma Mario – percussion

References

External links
Tin Angel Marker Starling webpage
I'm Willing Tin Angel Records webpage
"I'm Willing" Official Video

2016 albums